Valeri Aleksandrovich Yaroshenko (born 8 May 1997) is a Russian football player.

Club career
He made his professional debut in the Russian Professional Football League for FC Zenit-2 St. Petersburg on 19 April 2014 in a game against FC Znamya Truda Orekhovo-Zuyevo.

He made his Russian Premier League debut for FC Rostov on 29 October 2016 in a game against FC Amkar Perm.

References

External links

1997 births
Footballers from Saint Petersburg
Living people
Russian footballers
Russia youth international footballers
Association football midfielders
FC Rostov players
Russian Premier League players
FC Baltika Kaliningrad players
FC Ararat Moscow players
FC Zenit-2 Saint Petersburg players